Chaetoderma luna is a species of fungus belonging to the family Stereaceae.

Synonym:
 Peniophora luna Romell ex D.P.Rogers & H.S.Jacks., 1943 (= basionym)
 Chaetodermella luna (Romell ex D.P.Rogers & H.S.Jacks.) Rauschert, 1988

References

Stereaceae